Conocephalites Barrande, 1852, is a disused name for a genus of trilobite, of which the species have now been reassigned to other genera. The name was introduced as a replacement for Conocephalus Zenker, 1833, which was unavailable since Thunberg used it in 1815 for a genus of conehead bushcricket. Barrande however was unaware that Conocoryphe had already been proposed by Hawle and Corda in 1847.

The following species have been reassigned.
 C. anatinus = Monocheilus anatinus
 C.  antiquatus = Elrathia antiquata
 C. bailey = Bailiella bailey
 C. bavaricus = Leimitzia bavarica
 C. calciferous = Saratogia calcifera
 C. cirina = Conocoryphe cirina
 C. elegans = Bailiaspis elegans
 C. eryon = Kendallina eryon
 C. hofensis = Bavarilla hofensis
 C. micros = Conocoryphe micros
 C. nasutus = Maustonia nasutus
 C. ornatus = Conokephalina ornata
 C. oweni = Stigmacephalus oweni
 C. patersoni = Psalaspis patersoni
 C. robbi = Brunswickia robbi
 C. shumardi = Taenicephalus shumardi
 C. stephensi =  Tasmanocephalus stephensi
 C. subcoronatus = Alokistocare subcoronatus
 C. sulzeri = Conocoryphe sulzeri
 C. zenkeri = Loganopeltoides zenkeri

References 

Disused trilobite generic names
Taxa named by Joachim Barrande